Stephen George Henty (3 November 1811 – 18 December 1872) was a farmer and politician in colonial Victoria, a member of the Victorian Legislative Council.

Henty was born in West Tarring, Sussex, England, the son of Thomas Henty (1775–1839) and Frances Elizabeth, née Hopkins.

Henty arrived at the Swan River settlement with brothers James and John in 1829. In 1836 Stephen settled in Portland.

In 1839, Henty led an overland expedition to explore the Mount Gambier region. He was the first white man to climb the peak and view the blue crater lake. In 1842, Henty and his brother Edward laid claim to the land around Mount Gambier and established a sheep station there. Conflict with the local Aboriginal residents quickly ensued that same year with Henty's men shooting a number and burning their corpses. In March 1844, a band of Aboriginal people led by Koort Kirrup took a large number of Henty's sheep. Henty's men pursued and engaged them in a prolonged skirmish which resulted in the colonists having to retreat. The Southern Australian reported that other white pastoralists in the region were also having difficulties with Aboriginal attacks on their farmsteads and they resolved to form hunting parties and raid them "indiscriminately" if police protection did not come. The situation proved too hard for Stephen Henty, and even though Koort Kirrup was captured, Henty abandoned the Mount Gambier property later in 1844 with significant loss of capital.

In November 1856, Henty was elected to the Victorian Legislative Council for Western Province, a position he held until November 1870. For much of the period of Henty's Council membership, he and his family lived at Findon a mansion he built in Kew Melbourne.

Family
Stephen George Henty married Barbara Whilemena Bayntun–Sandys (1806–1891), daughter of Sir Edwin Bayntun–Sandys, Bart. Their children include:
Richmond Henty (August 1837 – April 1904) was born in Portland, Victoria, and is reckoned either the first or second white child born in Victoria. Richmond married his cousin Agnes Barbara Reed (c. 1837 – 9 September 1895), granddaughter of Sir E. Bayntun–Sandys; they had three sons and one daughter:
Ernest George Henty MLC (17 September 1862 – 25 June 1895) married Katie Cobham on 12 June 1890
Eulalie Henty ( – ) married Lieut. R. C. Ferrers Creer, RAN, on 15 June 1917 (divorced 1925). Their elder daughter Deirdre Henty-Creer (1918–2012) was a successful artist, while their son Henty Henty-Creer commanded one of the three midget submarines that attacked the German battleship  in World War II.
Eveline Henty married Capt. E. C. Starker in August 1888
Percival Edward Henty (c. 1867 – 26 March 1889)
George Henty ( – ) lived in Hamilton, Victoria
Walter Thomas (1856–1917), farmer at Hamilton

See also
Henty brothers

References

 

1811 births
1872 deaths
Members of the Victorian Legislative Council
People from Tarring, West Sussex
English emigrants to colonial Australia
19th-century Australian politicians
Settlers of Victoria (Australia)